Gasterocercus is a genus of beetles belonging to the  true weevil family.

List of Species
 Gasterocercus albifrons
 Gasterocercus anatinus
 Gasterocercus anthriboides
 Gasterocercus asper
 Gasterocercus bifasciatus
 Gasterocercus clitellarius
 Gasterocercus cristulatus
 Gasterocercus dejanii
 Gasterocercus dejeanii
 Gasterocercus depressirostris
 Gasterocercus dorsalis
 Gasterocercus dubitabilis
 Gasterocercus dumerilii
 Gasterocercus enokivorus
 Gasterocercus erinaceus
 Gasterocercus exiguus
 Gasterocercus horridus
 Gasterocercus hypsophilus
 Gasterocercus lateralis
 Gasterocercus latirostris
 Gasterocercus latreillei
 Gasterocercus longimanus
 Gasterocercus longipes
 Gasterocercus melancholicus
 Gasterocercus mexicanus
 Gasterocercus nigroaeneus
 Gasterocercus nocturnus
 Gasterocercus oblitus
 Gasterocercus onizo
 Gasterocercus petulans
 Gasterocercus plumipes
 Gasterocercus propugnator
 Gasterocercus quinquepunctatus
 Gasterocercus richteri
 Gasterocercus scabrirostris
 Gasterocercus semicircularis
 Gasterocercus setosus
 Gasterocercus singularis
 Gasterocercus stratum
 Gasterocercus tamanukii
 Gasterocercus variegatus

References 

  Biolib
 Zipcodezoo

 
Taxa named by Gaspard Auguste Brullé